The 2018 Pasay Voyagers season is the first season of the franchise in the Maharlika Pilipinas Basketball League (MPBL).

Key dates
 June 12, 2018: Regular Season Begins.

Current roster

Datu Cup

Standings

Game log

|- style="background:#fcc;"
| 1
| June 16
| Navotas
| L 75–83
| Yvan Ludovice (17)
| Bobby Balucanag (8)
| Yvan Ludovice (3)
| San Andres Sports Complex
| 0–1
|- style="background:#bfb;"
| 2
| June 28
| Rizal
| W 87–81
| Shaquille Alanes (17)
| Roberto Bartolo (6)
| Yvan Ludovice (13)
| San Juan Gymnasium
| 1–1

|- style="background:#fcc;"
| 3
| July 11
| San Juan
| L 66–89
| Shaquille Alanes (16)
| Jan Jamon (7)
| Roberto Bartolo (3)
| Filoil Flying V Centre
| 1–2
|- style="background:#fcc;"
| 4
| July 24
| Bacoor
| L 86–90
| Jan Jamon (23)
| Jan Jamon (7)
| Yvan Ludovice (4)
| Cuneta Astrodome
| 1–3

References

Pasay Voyagers Season, 2018–19